FC Metallurg Lipetsk is an association football club in Lipetsk, Russia, formed in 1957. Their home, Metallurg Stadium, is located on Pervomayskaya Street, 59, in Lipetsk.

History
Their best result came in 1997 when they came 2nd in the Russian First Division.

Coach Stanislav Bernikov of Metallurg was attacked by fans after a defeat on 25 September 2006 on his players, they shot at the coach and team with rubber bullets. Three players suffered with injuries and went to hospital; the coach Bernikov was then summarily dismissed.

In 2008, they won the Russian Second Division in the Center Zone and were promoted for 2009 Russian First Division but relegated again to third level after finishing First Division as 19th.

On 10 June 2021, they secured first place in their PFL group and promotion to the second-tier Russian Football National League for the 2021–22 season, for the first time since 2009. The club was relegated back to the third tier after one season.

Colours are red and black hooped shirts, black shorts.

Notable coaches
Gennadi Styopushkin (2009)
Soferbi Yeshugov (2007–2008)
Aleksei Petrushin (2007)
Stanislav Bernikov (2006)
Anatoli Davydov (2002–2005)
Vladimir Yevsyukov (2001)
Vladimir Dergach (2000)
Sergei Savchenkov (1999–2000)
Vladimir Fedotov (1998)
Yuri Shishlov (1998)
Vladimir Alekseyevich Mikhaylov (1987–1989)
Nikolay Kiselyov (1984–1985)

Current squad
As of 22 February 2023, according to the Second League website.

Notable players
Had international caps for their respective countries. Players whose name is listed in bold represented their countries while playing for Metallurg.

Russia/USSR
 German Apukhtin
 Andrei Chichkin
 Yevgeni Dolgov
 Eduard Dubinski
 Ilshat Faizulin
 Sergei Filippenkov
 Yury Kovalyov
 Boris Razinsky

   Oleg Sergeyev
 Igor Sklyarov

Former USSR countries
 Dzmitry Aharodnik
 Konstantin Kovalenko
 Oleg Musin
 Sergey Zhunenko
 Aleksandrs Jeļisejevs

 Valentīns Lobaņovs
 Mihails Ziziļevs
 Tomas Kančelskis
 Saulius Mikalajūnas
 Audrius Šlekys
 Tomas Žiukas
 Andrei Manannikov
 Wýaçeslaw Krendelew
 Sergey Lushan

References

External links
Official website 
Fans' website  

 
Football clubs in Russia
Sport in Lipetsk
1957 establishments in Russia
Association football clubs established in 1957